Matthew Chandler Fox (born July 14, 1966) is an American actor. He is best known for his roles as Charlie Salinger on Party of Five (1994–2000) and Jack Shephard on the drama series Lost (2004–2010), the latter of which earned him Golden Globe Award and Primetime Emmy Award nominations. Fox has also performed in ten feature films, including We Are Marshall (2006), Vantage Point (2008), Alex Cross (2012), Emperor (2012) and Bone Tomahawk (2015).

Early life 
Fox was born in Abington, Pennsylvania, the son of Loretta B. (née Eagono) and Francis G. Fox. One of his paternal great-great-great-grandfathers was Union General George Meade. His father was from a "very blue-blood" Pennsylvania family of mostly English descent, while his mother was of half Italian and half British ancestry. The second of three boys, Fox moved to Wyoming when he was a year old with his parents and brothers, Francis, Jr. (b. 1961) and Bayard (b. 1969). They settled in Crowheart, Wyoming, on the Wind River Indian Reservation. His mother was a teacher, and his father, who had been a consultant for an oil company, raised longhorn cattle and horses, and grew barley for Coors beer. Matthew attended Wind River High School in Pavillion, Wyoming and transferred to Deerfield Academy during his senior year and graduated in 1985. He graduated from Columbia University with a B.A. in economics in 1989.

Career 

At the age of 25, Fox made his debut on an episode of Wings. That same year, he also starred on a short-lived dramatic series, Freshman Dorm. Still not a familiar face on the small screen, he continued to be cast in supporting roles, including the role of Charlie in the CBS Schoolbreak Special series If I Die Before I Wake, before he made his big-screen debut in My Boyfriend's Back (1993).

In 1994, Fox was cast in a starring role as Charlie Salinger, the eldest of five siblings who lose both parents in a car accident on the 1994–2000 teen drama Party of Five, co-starring with Scott Wolf, Neve Campbell, Jennifer Love Hewitt, and Lacey Chabert. In 1996, People Magazine named Fox one of the 50 Most Beautiful People in the World. After Party of Five was canceled following its sixth season, Fox starred in another TV series, Haunted, in 2002.

From September 2004 until May 2010, Fox played the role of the dedicated yet troubled surgeon, Dr. Jack Shephard, on Lost. He initially auditioned for the role of James "Sawyer" Ford. However, co-creator J. J. Abrams thought he would be better for the role of Jack, a role originally slated to be for the pilot episode only.
Fox was nominated for a Golden Globe, won the 2005 Satellite Award, and shared the 2006 Screen Actors Guild Award for Outstanding Performance by an Ensemble in a Drama Series, for his role in Lost.

On December 2, 2006, Fox hosted Saturday Night Live with musical guests Tenacious D. In 2006, he co-starred with Matthew McConaughey in the sports drama We Are Marshall. He also played a bit part in the action film Smokin' Aces (along with Lost's co-star Néstor Carbonell and future cast member Kevin Durand) and starred in the 2008 thriller Vantage Point. In May 2008, Fox starred as Racer X in the movie Speed Racer.

Fox has repeatedly stated that he is "done with television" after Lost.

In 2011, he starred in the stage play In a Forest, Dark and Deep with Olivia Williams in London's West End.

Fox co-starred in Alex Cross (2012), as the villain, Michael "The Butcher" Sullivan, nicknamed "Picasso". For the role, Fox developed an extremely muscular physique and shed most of his body fat. The film was a critical and commercial failure but Fox was praised for his transformation and credibility in a vastly different role from Lost's Jack Shephard.

He appeared very briefly in the 2013 film World War Z which starred Brad Pitt.

He starred in the film Extinction released in July 2015, directed by Miguel Ángel Vivas, an adaptation of Juan de Dios Garduño's bestselling book Y pese a todo.

That same year, Fox also co-starred in the critically acclaimed American horror Western Bone Tomahawk. He had always wanted to act in a Western.

After seven years away from the screen, Fox was cast in the lead role of a limited series Last Light, which was released on Peacock.

Personal life 

In 1992, Fox married his long-time girlfriend, Margherita Ronchi, a native of Italy. The couple met while Fox was a student at Columbia. The couple later had two children, Kyle Allison and Byron. Fox is also a photographer. A bonus disc released with The Complete First Series of Lost includes features "The Art of Matthew Fox", showing pictures he took of the cast and crew while on set.

Fox has a passion for flying airplanes, and owns a Bonanza G36. "To be up there by yourself, and it's all up to you whether it's gonna be an amazing flight or it's not gonna go as beautiful[ly]. I feel like I'm hyper-prepared when I fly. There is so much you don't have control over."

Legal issues and allegations of abuse

On August 28, 2011, Fox was accused of assaulting a female bus driver in Cleveland, Ohio. Prosecutors decided not to charge Fox. In May 2012, the bus driver withdrew a civil suit, after her lawyer withdrew and revealed that she "intentionally failed and refused to provide full and timely cooperation and information". In October 2012, Fox appeared on The Ellen DeGeneres Show and dismissed all accusations as false, stating he could not refute them at the time due to the ongoing trial. He proclaimed he was punched in the face by a man and retaliated, and that the bus driver tried to extort money from him through her version of events; he said the prosecutors in the criminal case determined her accusations a "hoax".

In May 2012, his Lost co-star Dominic Monaghan tweeted about Fox, "He beats women. Not isolated incidents. Often." Fox denied the claims, saying "the Monaghan situation -- was a pile of bullshit, and I'm not gonna waste too much breath on that." He also told Men's Journal in 2012, "I have never hit a woman before. Never have, never will. But I think there's still gonna be a lot of people out there who'll think it's true no matter what."

Filmography

Film

Television

Video games

Director

Awards and nominations

References

External links 

 

1966 births
20th-century American male actors
21st-century American male actors
Male actors from Pennsylvania
Male actors from Wyoming
American male film actors
American people of English descent
American people of Italian descent
American male television actors
Deerfield Academy alumni
Living people
People from Abington Township, Montgomery County, Pennsylvania
People from Fremont County, Wyoming
Columbia Lions football players
Columbia College (New York) alumni
Meade family